Jason Wilson (born 9 December 1969) is a professional English darts player who plays in Professional Darts Corporation events.

He earned a PDC Tour Card in 2015, and qualified for the 2016 Players Championship Finals, but was defeated by Peter Wright in the first round.

References

External links

1969 births
Living people
English darts players
People from Countesthorpe
Sportspeople from Leicestershire